Diners is the stage name of guitar pop musician Blue Broderick. They play both solo and with a full band.

Career
The first Diners album titled Throw Me a Ten was released on cassette by Snorin' Desert Tapes in 2012, later issued on vinyl by Lauren Records 2016. A second album titled Always Room was released in 2014 with Lost Sound Tapes, Phat 'N' Phunky, and Diet Pop Records. In 2015, Diners released an EP titled It's All True. In 2016, Diners put out their third full-length album titled Three via Asian Man Records, Lost Sound Tapes, and Diet Pop Records. Diners fourth full-length album, Leisure World, was released on April 24 via Lauren Records.

Discography
Studio albums
Throw Me A Ten (2012, Snorin Desert Tapes; pressed on vinyl in 2016 by Lauren Records)
Always Room (2014, Lost Sound Tapes, Phat 'N' Phunky, Diet Pop Records)
Three (2016, Asian Man Records, Lost Sound Tapes, Diet Pop Records)
Leisure World (2020, Lauren Records)
Four Wheels and the Truth (2022, Lauren Records)

EPs
It's All True (2015, 	Phat 'N' Phunky)
"Split" with Walter Etc. (2017, Lauren Records)

References

Musicians from Phoenix, Arizona
1992 births
Living people